The following is a list of the 149 municipalities (comuni) of the Province of Como, Lombardy, Italy.

A 

Albavilla
Albese con Cassano
Albiolo
Alserio
Alta Valle Intelvi
Alzate Brianza
Anzano del Parco
Appiano Gentile
Argegno
Arosio
Asso

B 
Barni
Bellagio
Bene Lario
Beregazzo con Figliaro
Binago
Bizzarone
Blessagno
Blevio
Bregnano
Brenna
Brienno
Brunate
Bulgarograsso

C 
Cabiate
Cadorago
Caglio
Cagno
Campione d'Italia
Cantù
Canzo
Capiago Intimiano
Carate Urio
 Carbonate
Carimate
Carlazzo
Carugo 
Caslino d'Erba
Casnate con Bernate
Cassina Rizzardi
Castelmarte
Castelnuovo Bozzente 
Cavargna
Centro Valle Intelvi
Cerano d'Intelvi
Cermenate
Cernobbio
Cirimido
Claino con Osteno
Colonno
Colverde
Como 
Corrido
Cremia
Cucciago
Cusino

D 
Dizzasco
Domaso
Dongo
Dosso del Liro

E 
Erba
Eupilio

F 
Faggeto Lario
Faloppio
Fenegrò
Figino Serenza
Fino Mornasco

G 
Garzeno
Gera Lario 
Grandate
Grandola ed Uniti
Gravedona ed Uniti
Griante
Guanzate

I 
Inverigo

L 
Laglio
Laino
Lambrugo
Lasnigo
Lenno
Lezzeno
Limido Comasco
Lipomo
Livo
Locate Varesino
Lomazzo
Longone al Segrino
Luisago
Lurago d'Erba
Lurago Marinone
Lurate Caccivio

M 
Magreglio
Mariano Comense
Maslianico
Menaggio
Merone
Mezzegra
Moltrasio
Monguzzo
Montano Lucino
Montemezzo
Montorfano
Mozzate
Musso

N 
Nesso
Novedrate

O 
Olgiate Comasco
Oltrona di San Mamette
Orsenigo
Ossuccio

P 
Peglio 
Pianello del Lario
Pigra
Plesio
Pognana Lario
Ponna
Ponte Lambro
Porlezza
Proserpio
Pusiano

R  
Rezzago
Rodero
Ronago
Rovellasca
Rovello Porro

S 
Sala Comacina
San Bartolomeo Val Cavargna 
San Fermo della Battaglia
San Nazzaro Val Cavargna
Sant'Abbondio
Santa Maria Rezzonico
Schignano
Senna Comasco
Solbiate
Sorico
Sormano
Stazzona

T 
Tavernerio
Torno
Tremezzo
Trezzone
Turate

U 
Uggiate-Trevano

V 
Val Rezzo
Valbrona
Valmorea
Valsolda
Veleso
Veniano
Vercana
Vertemate con Minoprio
Villa Guardia

Z 
Zelbio

See also
List of municipalities of Italy

References

Como